Dying Breed may refer to:

 Dying Breed (film), a 2008 Australian horror film
 "Dying Breed" (song), by Five Finger Death Punch, 2009
 "Dying Breed", a song by The Killers from the 2020 album Imploding the Mirage
 "The Dying Breed", a Beck soundtrack
 "Dyin Breed", a song by Polo G from the 2019 album Die a Legend

See also 
 Rare Breed (disambiguation)
 Decline (disambiguation)
 Endangered species
 Last of a Dyin' Breed, a 2012 album by Lynyrd Skynyrd
 The Last of a Dying Breed, a 2000 album by Scarface
 "The Last of a Dying Breed", a  2006 song by Neal McCoy